Sean Robin Kerly  (born 29 January 1960) is an English former field hockey player.

Biography
Kerly was born in Whitstable and was educated at Chatham House Grammar School in Ramsgate. He has played club hockey for Canterbury, Southgate and Herne Bay. In 1981, he made his England senior international debut.

At the 1984 Summer Olympics in Los Angeles, he helped Great Britain secure the bronze medal. Kerly scored the winning goal in the bronze medal match in LA against Australia (3-2). The success is attributed as having revived interest in hockey in Britain. Two years later, at the 1986 Men's Hockey World Cup, Britain won the silver medal on home ground in London, with Kerly scoring four goals in the tournament.

After scoring a hat-trick against Pakistan in the 1987 Men's Hockey Champions Trophy and eight goals in one game during the 1987 European Club Cup he entered the 1988 Olympics as a well known name in Britain. In 1988, he was a member of the gold medal winning Great Britain and Northern Ireland squad at the 1988 Summer Olympics in Seoul. He scored a hat-trick in the semi-final against Australia before Britain defeated West Germany 3-1 in the final, with Kerly scoring once and Imran Sherwani twice.

Since retirement, he has also been involved in commentary for international hockey coverage on national television.

References

External links
 
 

1960 births
Living people
English male field hockey players
English Olympic medallists
Olympic field hockey players of Great Britain
British male field hockey players
Field hockey players at the 1984 Summer Olympics
Field hockey players at the 1988 Summer Olympics
Field hockey players at the 1992 Summer Olympics
Olympic gold medallists for Great Britain
Members of the Order of the British Empire
Olympic bronze medallists for Great Britain
People from Whitstable
Olympic medalists in field hockey
Medalists at the 1988 Summer Olympics
Medalists at the 1984 Summer Olympics
Southgate Hockey Club players
1990 Men's Hockey World Cup players